Seagulls Fly Low is a 1977 Italian crime film written and directed by Giorgio Cristallini and starring Maurizio Merli, Nathalie Delon and Mel Ferrer. It was shot between Rome, Civitavecchia and Ponza.

Plot

Cast

Maurizio Merli as Jeff Jacobson / Albert Morgan
Nathalie Delon as Isabelle Michereau
Mel Ferrer as  Roberto Micheli
Dagmar Lassander as  Amparo
 Andrea Esterhazy  as  Calvi 
 Franco Garofalo as Killer

References

External links

1978 films
1970s Italian-language films
Italian crime drama films
1970s crime drama films
Films directed by Ferdinando Baldi
Films directed by Giorgio Cristallini
1977 drama films
1977 films
1978 drama films
Films scored by Roberto Pregadio
1970s Italian films